The Château de Verdelles is a historic castle in Poillé-sur-Vègre, Sarthe, Pays de la Loire, France.

History
The castle was completed in 1490.

Architectural significance
It has been listed as an official monument since 1922.

References

External links
Official website

Châteaux in Sarthe
Houses completed in 1490
Monuments historiques of Pays de la Loire